Linaria algarviana is a species of toadflax in the plantain family Plantaginaceae, endemic to southern Portugal, specifically the western portion of the Algarve. It inhabits clearings of xerophilic scrub, pastures and meadows close to the coast, very rarely in vineyards and pine forests. Usually in dry places, with sandy substrate.

References

algarviana
Endemic flora of Portugal
Endemic flora of the Iberian Peninsula